Yao (Jaoi, Yaoi, Yaio, Anacaioury) is an extinct Cariban language of Trinidad and French Guiana, attested in a single 1640 word list recorded by Joannes de Laet. It is thought that the Yao people migrated from the Orinoco to the islands perhaps a century earlier, after the Kaliña. The name 'Anacaioury' is that of a number of chiefs encountered over a century or so.

Yao is too poorly attested to classify within Cariban with any confidence, though Terrence Kaufman links it to the extinct Tiverikoto. A few of the attested words are:

nonna or noene 'moon', weyo 'sun', capou 'céu', chirika 'star', pepeïte 'wind', kenape 'rain', soye 'earth', parona 'sea', ouapoto 'fire', aroua 'jaguar', pero 'dog' (from Spanish).

References

Cariban languages
Extinct languages of South America
Indigenous languages of the Caribbean
Languages of French Guiana
Languages extinct in the 17th century
Languages of Trinidad and Tobago